Zelman v. Simmons-Harris, 536 U.S. 639 (2002), was a 5–4 decision of the United States Supreme Court that upheld an Ohio program that used school vouchers. The Court decided that the program did not violate the Establishment Clause of the First Amendment, even if the vouchers could be used for private religious schools.

Background
The public schools in many of the poorer parts of Cleveland were deemed failures, and the legislature enacted the Pilot Project Scholarship Program in an effort to address the problem. Ohio had been running the program, which allowed parents of qualified students in the Cleveland School District, from the 1996–97 school year, to use public money to pay for tuition at private schools in the program, which included religious schools.

Of the 56 private schools that agreed to the program, 46 were sectarian. The program aimed to improve the low educational performance of the students in the school district. 

The program provided tuition vouchers for up to $2,250 a year to some parents of students in the school district to attend participating public or private schools in the city and neighboring suburbs. The program also allocated tutorial aid for students who remained in public schools.

The vouchers were distributed to parents according to their financial need. The parents chose where to enroll their children. Since the number of students applying to the program greatly exceeded the number of vouchers available, recipients were chosen by lottery from among the eligible families. In the 1999–2000 school year, 82% of the participating private schools had a religious affiliation. None of the adjacent suburban public schools joined the program. 96% of the students receiving vouchers were enrolled in religiously affiliated schools and 60% were from low-income families, at or below the poverty line.

Participating schools were not permitted to discriminate on the basis of race, religion, or ethnic background. They are also not allowed to "advocate or foster unlawful behavior or teach hatred of any person or group on the basis of race, ethnicity, national origin, or religion." A group of Ohio taxpayers then filed an action against Susan Zelman, the superintendent of public education in Ohio, by pleading that the program violated the Establishment Clause. Simmons-Harris, along with other residents of the Cleveland area, argued that the government "could not pay tuition for students to attend religious school." The local federal district court, in addition to the Court of Appeals for the Sixth Circuit, ruled in favor of Simmons-Harris.

Zelman continued the case and appealed to the Supreme Court of the United States, which sustained the voucher program.

First Amendment 
The First Amendment protects the rights to freedom of religion and to freedom of expression from government interference. The First Amendment comes into play because the taxpayers of Ohio said that the program was a violation of the Establishment Clause, one of the two clauses of the First Amendment. The Establishment Clause guarantees freedom of religion and strictly prohibits the government from passing any legislation to establish an official religion or preferring one religion over another; it thus enforces the "separation of church and state."

Since the program was designed to provide no incentive for religious private, secular private, or public schools, the taxpayers did not want their money to pay for the children who wanted religious schooling.

Majority opinion 
Chief Justice Rehnquist delivered the majority opinion. He declared that the school voucher program was not in violation of the Establishment Clause. He also deemed that government support for religion was constitutional if it did not occur de jure but de facto and also failed to specify or to encourage religious schools. Cleveland's program was declared to be religiously neutral and to be giving parents the benefit of true private choice.

Rehnquist referred to the program's aims as strictly secular assistance for the poor, low-performing children, who would be otherwise stuck in the communities that were failed by the school district.

Moreover, the issue was whether the school voucher program encouraged or inhibited religion directly. The Court used its precedent in Mueller v. Allen (1983) that aid could constitutionally be given to parents but not to schools. The Court found that there were thus no religious advances, in reference to the Establishment Clause.

The likelihood of religious private schools in the area at the particular time and the decision of the student were not fundamental in the constitutionality of the voucher program. The vouchers were available to a general class of citizens who met the needed criteria and were given a personal, independent choice of voucher-accepting schools. As a state plan to make a better education readily available for poor students, there was no religious bias. Offering parents the choice to use the voucher for tutorial aid in public school, a scholarship for religious or nonreligious private schools or magnet schools, or enrollment in community college made no incentive to pick a religious private school.

If parents wanted to pick religious schools for their children to attend, their choice should have no bearing on the government. The incidental advancement of a religious mission was reasonably inferable to the individual, not the government. The government's role ended with the expense of beliefs. 

Rehnquist continued that the program encouraged the true private choice of the family. By basing school vouchers strictly on the economic means of the student and on geographic location, religious concerns were factored. Another primary issue of the case concerned the 96% of scholarship recipients who attended religious private school. The Court noted that the program actually provided disincentives for religious schools: the private school received only half of that allocated to community schools and only a third of that allocated to magnet schools.

Concurring opinions 
Justice O'Connor and Justice Thomas added comments when they both delivered a separate concurring opinion to the majority.

O'Connor strongly believed that the program made no real and clear distinction between religious and non-religious schools and that both were rational education alternatives. O'Connor mentioned in her concurrence that many beneficiaries used community and private non-religious schools. That and the fact that true private school choice was available made the program not technically violate the Establishment Clause.

She focused on a few specific points. First, like the majority, she emphasized that its inquiry required an evaluation of all reasonable educational options that Ohio provided to the Cleveland school system, regardless of whether they were formally made available in the same section of the Ohio Code as the voucher program. She insisted that the facts were critical in cases arising under the Establishment Clause by saying that failing to look at all of the educational options would "ignore how the educational system in Cleveland actually functions."

Also, she believed that the "decision, when considered in light of other longstanding government programs that impact religious organizations and our prior Establishment Clause jurisprudence, [does not] mark a dramatic break from the past."

Finally, she believed, "The share of public resources that reach religious schools is not... as significant as respondents suggest.... $8.2 million is no small sum, it pales in comparison to the amount of funds that federal, state, and local governments already provide religious institutions" without there being any serious question regarding the constitutionality of such support. Her conclusion in the case, like in many other cases, was tied closely to the facts of the case.

Thomas's opinion focused on the civil rights implications of the case:
"Frederick Douglass once said that '[e]ducation... means emancipation. It means light and liberty. It means the uplifting of the soul of man into the glorious light of truth, the light by which men can only be made free.' Today many of our inner-city public schools deny emancipation to urban minority students. Despite this Court's observation nearly 50 years ago in Brown v. Board of Education, that 'it is doubtful that any child may reasonably be expected to succeed in life if he is denied the opportunity of an education,' urban children have been forced into a system that continually fails them. These cases present an example of such failures. Besieged by escalating financial problems and declining academic achievement, the Cleveland City School District was in the midst of an academic emergency when Ohio enacted its scholarship program."

Thomas gave another string concurrence to this Supreme Court decision: "The protection of religious liberty using the Fourteenth Amendment is legitimate, but to use the Establishment Clause to prevent the operation of a perfectly neutral program concerning school choice is not." Thomas simply asserted that all this program did was essentially provide an educational opportunity to a range of disadvantaged minority children, the importance of it all.

Dissenting opinions
Justice Stevens and Justice Souter both wrote a separate dissenting opinion.

Justice Stevens's dissenting opinion focused on the method by which the majority reached its conclusions. In his view, the Court "should ignore three factual matters that are discussed at length." Specifically, he argued that the Court should not consider the severe educational crisis that confronted the school district when Ohio enacted its voucher program, the wide range of choices that have been made available to students within the public school system, or the voluntary character of the private choice to prefer a private religious education over a public secular education.

Justice Souter's dissenting opinion presented the voucher program as using the taxpayers for religious and secular instruction and card to the verdict of a similar case. Everson v. Board of Education decided that no tax could be used to support religious means. Because Ohio's school voucher program offered aid to those who wished to attend religious private schools, it directly violated Everson. Furthermore, allowing vouchers to be used with religious schooling advanced secular learning and institutions. Souter expresses that ignoring the ruling of Everson ignored the importance of neutrality and private choice. Moreover, disregarding Everson promoted a new way of thinking that held government aid as insignificant in constitutional grounds. He commented on the voucher money that was going to religious schools as a reflection of free choice by families: "The 96.6% reflects, instead the fact that too few nonreligious school desks are available and few, but religious schools can afford to accept more than a handful of voucher students.... For the overwhelming number of children in the voucher scheme, the only alternative to the public schools is religious." Souter strongly voiced his denunciation on the fact that the decision undermined the point of prohibiting religious establishments. He claimed that it was all to save religion from its own corruption, but participation in the program depended on adopting rules that might come in forms of religious discrimination.

Private choice test
Moderate Justices Kennedy and O'Connor and conservative Justices Rehnquist, Scalia, and Thomas combined to form the majority.

The Ohio program passed a five-part test that was developed by the Court in the case, the private choice test. It states that a voucher program, to be constitutional, must meet all five criteria:
The program must have a valid secular purpose.
Aid must go to parents, not schools.
A broad class of beneficiaries must be covered.
The program must be neutral with respect to religion.
There must be adequate nonreligious options.

The court ruled that the Ohio program met the test:
The valid secular purpose of the program was "providing educational assistance to poor children in a demonstrably failing public school system."
The vouchers were given to the parents.
The "broad class" was all students enrolled in currently failing programs.
Parents who received vouchers were not required to enroll in a religious-based school.
There were other public schools in adjoining districts as well as nonreligious private schools in the Cleveland area that would accept the vouchers.

Rehnquist, writing for the majority, stated, "The incidental advancement of a religious mission, or the perceived endorsement of a religious message, is reasonably attributable to the individual aid recipients not the government, whose role ends with the disbursement of benefits." In theory, there was no need for parents to use religious schools, and if the law did not especially encourage the use of vouchers for religious schools, the fact that most parents chose parochial schools was irrelevant. Funding was given to the parents to disburse as they chose, but in Lemon v. Kurtzman, the funding at question was given directly to the schools, which failed the test.

In his concurring opinion, Thomas emphasized that voucher programs, like the one in the case, were essential because "failing urban public schools disproportionately affect minority children most in need of educational opportunity." He stated that vouchers and other forms of publicly funded private school choice are necessary to give families an opportunity to enroll their children in better, private schools. Otherwise, "the core purposes of the Fourteenth Amendment" would be frustrated.

The dissenting opinions disagreed, and Stevens wrote that "the voluntary character of the private choice to prefer a parochial education over an education in the public school system seems to me quite irrelevant to the question whether the government's choice to pay for religious indoctrination is constitutionally permissible." Souter questioned how the Court could both keep Everson as precedent and decide the case as it did. He also found that religious education and secular education could not be separated, which would automatically violate the Establishment Clause. The establishment clause claims that State are passing laws in correlation to religion.

Blaine Amendments
Most state constitutions have so-called Blaine Amendments, which specifically forbid state funding of religious and/or sectarian education.  As a question of state, not federal, law, Ohio's Blaine Amendment was not considered by federal courts in the case.

Florida's Opportunity Scholarship voucher program was ruled unconstitutional on Blaine grounds in a split 8-5 First District Court of Appeal ruling in Nov. 2004. The issue was argued before the Florida Supreme Court in 2005, with voucher advocates hoping to take the case to the U.S. Supreme Court in an effort to invalidate Blaine Amendments nationwide, following the Zelman decision. However, the Florida Supreme Court sidestepped the issue altogether and declared the program unconstitutional on separate grounds in an effort to avoid U.S. Supreme Court scrutiny.

See also
 List of United States Supreme Court cases, volume 536
 List of United States Supreme Court cases
 Lemon v. Kurtzman (1971)

References

External links

Sixth Circuit Decision
Summary of case from the Roundtable on Religion and Social Welfare Policy

United States Supreme Court cases
United States Supreme Court cases of the Rehnquist Court
Establishment Clause case law
United States education case law
2002 in United States case law
2002 in religion
2002 in education
Education in Cleveland
United States lawsuits